Frederick Bernard Rooney Jr. (November 6, 1925 – December 23, 2019) was an American politician from Pennsylvania who served as a Democratic member of the U.S. House of Representatives for Pennsylvania's 15th congressional district from 1963 to 1979.

Early life and education
Rooney was born in Bethlehem, Pennsylvania to Fred B. (1881–1945) and Veronica K. (McGreevy) Rooney (1887–1969).  He graduated from Bethlehem High School in 1944 and served in the United States Army from February 1944 to April 1946, with service in Europe as a paratrooper.  He graduated from the University of Georgia at Athens in 1950 with a Bachelor of Business Administration (BBA) degree.  He worked in the real estate and insurance business.

Career

Political career
Rooney served as a member of the Pennsylvania State Senate for the 18th district from November 5, 1958, until his resignation on August 6, 1963.

He was elected as a Democrat to the 88th Congress, by special election, to fill the vacancy caused by the death of United States Representative Francis E. Walter, and reelected to the seven succeeding Congresses. Rooney served on the House Transportation Committee, where his specialties included railroad issues.  He was one of the architects of the 1976 legislation that established Conrail, which took over the operation of potentially profitable railroad companies that had fallen into bankruptcy, including the Penn Central.

He was an defeated in his bid for reelection by Donald L. Ritter in 1979.

Post-political career
After leaving Congress, he joined Cassidy & Associates in Washington, D.C., one of the nation's largest government relations and lobbying firms. He later he went into business for himself, representing Conrail, the Association of American Railroads, and the American Iron and Steel Institute.

In 2009, a portion of Pennsylvania Route 378 in Bethlehem from US 22 to the Hill to Hill Bridge was renamed the Fred B. Rooney Highway, recognizing his role in the creation of that portion of the highway.

Personal life
Rooney's nephew T. J. Rooney also served in the Pennsylvania General Assembly.

Death
Rooney died at his home in Washington D.C. on December 23, 2019. He was 94.

References
5. "Fred B Rooney" Obituary, Washington Post, print edition 29 DEC 2019.

|-

1925 births
2019 deaths
20th-century American politicians
United States Army personnel of World War II
Burials at Arlington National Cemetery
Military personnel from Pennsylvania
Democratic Party members of the United States House of Representatives from Pennsylvania
Democratic Party Pennsylvania state senators
Politicians from Bethlehem, Pennsylvania
University of Georgia alumni
United States Army soldiers
Members of Congress who became lobbyists